Silsean at , is the 92nd–highest peak in Ireland on the Arderin scale, and the 114th–highest peak on the Vandeleur-Lynam scale. Silsean is in the central sector, at the western edge, of the Wicklow Mountains, in Wicklow, Ireland.  Silsean is on a small massif alongside Moanbane  which lies between the Blessington lakes (or Poulaphouca Reservoir), and the major massif of Mullaghcleevaun .


Bibliography

See also
Wicklow Way
Wicklow Round
Wicklow Mountains
Lists of mountains in Ireland
List of mountains of the British Isles by height
List of Hewitt mountains in England, Wales and Ireland

References

External links
MountainViews: The Irish Mountain Website, Silsean
MountainViews: Irish Online Mountain Database
The Database of British and Irish Hills , the largest database of British Isles mountains ("DoBIH")
Hill Bagging UK & Ireland, the searchable interface for the DoBIH

Mountains and hills of County Wicklow
Hewitts of Ireland
Mountains under 1000 metres